HESTA is an Australian industry superannuation fund for workers in health and community service sectors. HESTA services more than 90,000 employers and has more than 950,000 members, 80% of whom are women. It has close to $68 billion in funds under management. HESTA was formed in 1987. HESTA holds an Australian financial services licence.

History
HESTA removed all tobacco investments from its portfolios in 2013. In 2015, HESTA sold its stake in Transfield Services citing evidence of human rights violations inside the offshore detention centres run by the sharemarket-listed company.

Governance 
HESTA is run by a Trustee company called H.E.S.T. Australia Limited. The Board of the trustee consists of six Directors appointed by employees, six Directors appointed by employers, an independent Director and an independent chair. The CEO is Debby Blakey.

References

External links
HESTA website

Australian companies established in 1987
Financial services companies established in 1987
Superannuation funds in Australia